Royalston Falls is a   waterfall and granite gorge located in Royalston, Massachusetts along Falls Brook, a tributary of the Tully River which in turn is a tributary of the Millers River. The falls are part of a  open space preserve acquired in 1951 by the land conservation non-profit organization The Trustees of Reservations. The  Tully Trail and the  Metacomet-Monadnock Trail, a National Recreation Trail, pass through the property.

History
Royalston Falls was once called Forbes Falls for Calvin Forbes, a local property owner in the 1800s. The falls were previously the site of a town recreation area which included a playground; it was also the location of a casino. The preserve was a gift of Mr. and Mrs. George L. Foote in 1951 and 1954; additional land was added in 2002.

Recreation and conservation

The preserve is open to fishing, walking, picnicking, mountain biking, horseback riding, hunting (in season), cross country skiing, and hiking. A trailhead is located off Massachusetts Route 32 just short of the New Hampshire border. A second trailhead is located off the unmaintained Falls Road in Royalston.

Royalston Falls are part of a larger contiguous area of protected open space, connected by the Tully Trail and including the United States Army Corps of Engineers' Tully Lake flood control project, The Trustees of Reservations' Jacobs Hill and Doane's Falls properties, and Massachusetts state forest land. Tully Lake Campground, a 35-site walk-in and tent only facility jointly managed by the Army Corps of Engineers and the Trustees of Reservations, is located along the Tully Trail to the south.

References

External links

Royalston Falls The Trustees of Reservations
Tully Lake Campground The Trustees of Reservations
Map of the Tully Trail The Trustees of Reservations
Jacob's Hill The Trustees of Reservations
Doane's Falls The Trustees of Reservations
Tully Lake U.S. Army Corps of Engineers
Tully Lake map U.S. Army Corps of Engineers

The Trustees of Reservations
Landforms of Worcester County, Massachusetts
Waterfalls of Massachusetts
Open space reserves of Massachusetts
Protected areas of Worcester County, Massachusetts
Royalston, Massachusetts
1951 establishments in Massachusetts
Protected areas established in 1951